Humberside Airport  is an international airport at Kirmington in the Borough of North Lincolnshire, England,  from three large settlements: Grimsby (east), Hull (north) and Scunthorpe (west), on the A18, the latter two places reached by longer roads, in the case of Hull via England's longest bridge that crosses the Humber Estuary. It was owned by Manchester Airports Group (the largest UK-owned airport group) from 1999 until 1 August 2012, when it was sold to the Eastern Group of companies. North Lincolnshire Council retains a minority of shares in the Airport.

History
The airport was previously a Royal Air Force base, RAF Kirmington, opened in 1941 during the Second World War, from which No. 166 Squadron RAF operated the Avro Lancaster. The site was abandoned after the war in 1945, and lay unused until 1974 when the local council re-opened the site as Kirmington Airport. When the local area was renamed Humberside following local government re-organisation in England, the name was changed to Humberside Airport. The main runway, designated 03/21 (since redesignated 02/20) was extended to its current length in 1992, allowing operation of much larger aircraft.

In 2008, MAG announced that it was conducting a review of its strategy for Humberside Airport, and all options including disposal were under consideration. Initially it announced plans to sell Humberside Airport after nine years of ownership. In December 2008, MAG announced it intended to retain Humberside Airport, due to a number of investments, such as the new £1.6 million perishables hub, coupled with a surge in passenger numbers and little interest from potential bidders.

MAG sold its 83.7% share of Humberside in 2012 for £2.3 million to Eastern Group to focus on the larger airports in its portfolio. It was later revealed that MAG had bought the airport for almost £8 million more in 1999.
Bristow Helicopters sold Eastern Airways in 2019, but retained its majority share of Humberside Airport.

Operations
Passengers at the airport peaked in the early to mid-2000s when the facility was used by around 500,000 per year. This fell to around 200,000 passengers in 2016.

In October 2013 SAS Group began daily operations to Copenhagen, only to withdraw the service in April 2014 because of disappointing passenger numbers. However, Sun Air launched twice-weekly flights to Aalborg and Billund in April 2016, in order to support the off-shore wind industry in the Humber and Jutland locations. These flights were also suspended in December 2016.

The airport is also used to service the offshore gas storage and drilling operations for BP and Centrica Storage with over 5,000 air transport helicopter movements in 2016, the fourth highest in the UK. On 3 January 2013 it was reported that Bond Offshore Helicopters had been awarded a contract with Perenco and would start operating flights to Perenco's platforms in the Southern North Sea. This now means that the airport has three of the biggest UK helicopter operators based at the airport.

From 1 April 2015 Bristow Helicopters commenced operations from a new UK Search and Rescue base at Humberside. In October 2016 Bristow Helicopters and Bond (now Babcock) moved their offshore operations to Norwich, leaving CHC and UNI-FLY as the remaining helicopter companies based at Humberside. CHC was scheduled to commence a new contract for Ørsted (formerly DONG Energy) in April 2018, supporting North Sea wind farm construction.

Humberside has one of the highest NEQ approval levels of any airport in Europe, and saw significant growth in cargo throughput from 144 tonnes in 2007 to 1,132 tonnes in 2011. This was due to regular flights by Icelandair Cargo, however these ceased to operate in 2012 and cargo had reduced to 123 tonnes in 2016.

Humberside International has a CAA Public Use Aerodrome Licence (Number P739) that allows flights for the public transport of passengers or for flying instruction. It has an amount of general aviation activity, with five resident flying clubs and organisations offering fixed wing and rotary training. In May 2011, Weston Aviation opened a fixed-base operation (FBO). This will be the first dedicated FBO at the airport, where the company has also opened a regional charter sales office, to promote and develop the use of business and private aviation in Yorkshire and the Humber.

Airlines and destinations
The following airlines operate regular scheduled flights to and from Humberside:

Statistics

Passengers and movements

Routes

Ground transport

The 'Humber Flyer' by Stagecoach no longer serves Humberside Airport. Instead, Hornsby's Bus and Coach run a 2 hourly service to the town of Kirmington, while stopping within airport grounds each way (Monday-Friday).

Rail
The airport lies close to the South Humberside Main Line, which runs between Doncaster and the coast at Grimsby and Cleethorpes, running a few hundred metres to the north of the terminal. There is no stop on the line at this point and passengers must alight at the small, rural and unmanned Barnetby railway station some 2 miles (4 km) to the west of the airport, or proceed to Grimsby or Hull and use the bus service.
As of May 2022, a bus service operates from Scunthorpe calling at the surrounding villages (including Barnetby) and terminates at nearby Kirmington. The bus service runs on a two-hourly frequency and calls at Humberside Airport. However, the bus does not call at Barnetby railway station, so passengers must walk a short distance to the nearby bus stop on Kings Road.

Other facilities
The airline Eastern Airways has its head office in the Schiphol House on the airport property. Links Air was based at the airport, but moved to Doncaster Sheffield Airport in 2014.

BAE Systems opened an aircraft maintenance academy at the airport in the autumn of 2015. It is a partnership with the Resource Group and is known as the R J Mitchell Academy, after the designer of the Spitfire aircraft.

In 2010 a temporary hotel was erected for the use by the gas and oil rig workers. However, this operation is not designed or licensed to operate as accommodation for normal passengers. This is a temporary structure run by Nightel, a locally based niche business. There was a plan to build a permanent structure in the next five years once demand for the facility had been confirmed. A new 100 bedroom hotel, operating under the Hampton by Hilton brand, opened next to Nightel in July 2017.

Accidents and incidents
9 October 2013 – The passenger of Cessna 172 G-BCYR made a successful emergency landing at Humberside following the death of its pilot in flight. The passenger had no flying experience and was talked down by flying instructors. He had been on a local flight from Sandtoft Airfield, Lincolnshire when the pilot died. The incident formed the basis of a documentary broadcast in the United Kingdom by Channel 4 on 27 March 2014.

References

External links

 Official website

Airports in England
Airports in Lincolnshire
Airports established in 1974
1974 establishments in England